The subtropical antechinus (Antechinus subtropicus) is a species of small carnivorous marsupial of the family Dasyuridae. It was previously thought to be conspecific with the brown antechinus (Antechinus stuartii).

The subtropical antechinus is found south from Gympie in Queensland, Australia, to the far northeast of New South Wales, where it is essentially restricted to sub-tropical vine forest below 1000 m elevation. It is difficult to distinguish it from its close relatives, but its significant features include a long and narrow muzzle and a generally mid-brown colour. It is the largest of the brown antechinus complex. It mainly eats insects and after mating all of the males die of stress-related diseases, like many other species in this family.

References

Dasyuromorphs
Mammals of New South Wales
Mammals of Queensland
Marsupials of Australia
Mammals described in 2000